Morals and Dogma is third studio album (and fourth overall) by ambient noise artist Deathprod. It was released the same day as Deathprod's self-titled compilation which included three previous albums and Morals and Dogma. Release includes older material: track 2 was recorded in 1994, track 3 in 1996 while remaining in 2000.

In 2016, Pitchfork Media ranked it #50 on their list of the 50 Best Ambient Albums of All Time.

Track listing

Personnel 
Taken from:
Composition – Hans Magnus Ryan (tracks: 3), Helge Sten (tracks: 1, 2, 4), Ole Henrik Moe (tracks: 3)
Engineering, Mastering – Helge Sten
Production – Deathprod
Sleeve design – Helge Sten, Kim Hiorthøy
Violin, Harmonium – Hans Magnus Ryan (tracks: 2, 3)
Violin, Saw – Ole Henrik Moe (tracks: 1, 3, 4)

References

2004 albums
Rune Grammofon albums